The Stadio Partenio-Lombardi is a multi-purpose stadium in Avellino, Italy.  It is currently used mostly for football matches and is the home of U.S. Avellino 1912. The stadium was built in 1973 and holds 26,308.

On 9 June 2011 the stadium was dedicated to former Avellino player Adriano Lombardi.

Notable matches
The Partenio hosted the second leg of the 1990 UEFA Cup Final between Fiorentina and Juventus. On 11 October 2002, the Italy national under-21 football team won in Partenio 4–1 against Serbia national under-21 football team.

External links
 Frank Jasperneite images

References

Partenio
Partenio
Partenio
Partenio
Multi-purpose stadiums in Italy
Sports venues in Campania
Buildings and structures in the Province of Avellino
Sports venues completed in 1973